In statistics, the matrix t-distribution (or matrix variate t-distribution) is the generalization of the multivariate t-distribution from vectors to matrices. The matrix t-distribution shares the same relationship with the multivariate t-distribution that the matrix normal distribution shares with the multivariate normal distribution.  For example, the matrix t-distribution is the compound distribution that results from sampling from a matrix normal distribution having sampled the covariance matrix of the matrix normal from an inverse Wishart distribution.

In a Bayesian analysis of a multivariate linear regression model based on the matrix normal distribution, the matrix t-distribution is the posterior predictive distribution.

Definition
For a matrix t-distribution, the probability density function at the point  of an   space is

where the constant of integration K is given by

Here  is the multivariate gamma function.

The characteristic function and various other properties can be derived from the generalized matrix t-distribution (see below).

Generalized matrix t-distribution 

The generalized matrix t-distribution is a generalization of the matrix t-distribution with two parameters α and β in place of ν.

This reduces to the standard matrix t-distribution with 

The generalized matrix t-distribution is the compound distribution that results from an infinite mixture of a matrix normal distribution with an inverse multivariate gamma distribution placed over either of its covariance matrices.

Properties

If  then

The property above comes from Sylvester's determinant theorem:

The characteristic function is

where 

and where  is the type-two Bessel function of Herz of a matrix argument.

See also 
 Multivariate t-distribution
 Matrix normal distribution

Notes

External links
 A C++ library for random matrix generator

Random matrices
Multivariate continuous distributions